Apteropanorpa tasmanica, the Tasmanian snow scorpionfly, is a species of wingless scorpionfly native to Tasmania. The adults are generalised predators. The larvae live in moss and are locally common.

Apteropanorpa tasmanica is known to carry two species of parasitic mites, Leptus agrotis and Willungella rufosanus.

References

Mecoptera
Insects of Australia
Endemic fauna of Tasmania
Insects described in 1941
Taxa named by Frank M. Carpenter